Lima-Baleka Bosekilolo is a Congolese poet whose works include Les Marais brûlés [The Burnt Marais].

External links
UWA

Year of birth missing (living people)
Living people
Democratic Republic of the Congo poets
Democratic Republic of the Congo women poets
Place of birth missing (living people)
21st-century Democratic Republic of the Congo people